Alastos is a genus of beetles in the family Cerambycidae, containing the following species:

 Alastos batesi (Pascoe, 1888)
 Alastos pascoei Martins & Galileo, 1999

References

Hesperophanini